Naami Chor is a 1977 Bollywood action film directed by Kamal Mehra.

Cast
Biswajeet   
Shatrughan Sinha  
Leena Chandavarkar   
Keshto Mukherjee   
Durga Khote   
Dev Kumar   
Hiralal   
Gajanan Jagirdar

Songs
"Aapse Mujhe Aapse Maniye Na ManiyePyar Ho Hi Gaya" - Asha Bhosle
"Sukh Aur Dukh Is Duniya Me" - Mukesh
"Aaye Hai Jo Mehfil Me, Kuch Karke Dikha Denge" - Mahendra Kapoor, Asha Bhosle
"Gori Tori Mathe Pe Saj Gayi Bindiya" - Usha Mangeshkar, Asha Bhosle
"Kehte Hai Mujuko Raja, Mai Bajata Hu Dil Ka Baaja" - Kishore Kumar

External links
 

1977 films
1970s Hindi-language films
1977 action films
Films scored by Kalyanji Anandji
Indian action films